The North Carolina Tar Heels men's basketball team, representing the University of North Carolina at Chapel Hill, has had 113 players drafted into the National Basketball Association (NBA) since the league began holding the yearly event in 1947. Each NBA franchise seeks to add new players through an annual draft. The NBA uses a draft lottery to determine the first three picks of the NBA draft; the 14 teams that did not make the playoffs the previous year are eligible to participate. After the first three picks are decided, the rest of the teams pick in reverse order of their win–loss record. To be eligible for the NBA Draft, a player in the United States must be at least 19 years old during the calendar year of the draft and must be at least one year removed from the graduation of his high school class.

The drafts held between 1947 and 1949 were held by the Basketball Association of America (BAA). The BAA became the National Basketball Association after absorbing teams from the National Basketball League in the fall of 1949. Official NBA publications include the BAA Drafts as part of the NBA's draft history. From 1967 until the ABA–NBA merger in 1976, the American Basketball Association (ABA) held its own draft.

Through the 2019 NBA draft, a Tar Heel has been chosen first overall two times in the history of the event, James Worthy in 1982 and Brad Daughtery in 1986. Out of the thirty teams that currently make up the NBA, seven have not picked a player from North Carolina. The New York Knicks have selected nine former Tar Heels, which is the most of any current NBA franchise. Fifty-two Tar Heels have been drafted in the first round of the NBA Draft, with Coby White, Cameron Johnson, and Nassir Little being the latest. The most Tar Heels selected in the first round of a single NBA Draft is four, which happened twice, in 2005 and 2012. Sixteen players have been selected to either an ABA or NBA All-Star Game, sixteen have been a member of an NBA or ABA championship winning team, and nine have achieved both. The most Tar Heels selected in a single NBA Draft is five, in 1980. Of all the Tar Heels that have been drafted, five have been inducted into the Naismith Memorial Basketball Hall of Fame.

Key

Players selected in the NBA Draft

Players selected in the BAA and ABA drafts

Notes

References

General

 
 
 

Specific

North Carolina Tar Heels
 
North Carolina Tar Heels NBA draft